Mistakes Girls Do, also stylized as Mistakes Gals Do, is a Ugandan drama television series created and produced by Richard Mulindwa. The series is a production of Limit Productions. The series which had been running as a web series since its release in 2017 was picked up by Pearl Magic network when it started operating in 2018. The series is about the lives of young women, the mistakes they make in their lives, the consequences they face and the lessons they learn.

Cast
Joan Agaba		
Mukasa Brandon		
Jean Kobusingye Jovitah	
Nantambi Juliet	
Hellen Lukoma		
Doreen Mirembe		
Diana Nabantanzi		
Doreen Nabbanja	
Ninsiima Ronah	
Fiona Ssebandeke
Housen Mushema as Ian
Morris Mugisha as Kevin

Awards

References

External links

2017 Ugandan television series debuts
Ugandan drama television series
Pearl Magic original programming